A lute is a plucked string instrument with a neck and a deep round back.

Lute or lutes may also refer to:

People
 Lute (rapper) (Luther Nicholson, born 1989), American rapper
 Luther Lute Barnes (born 1947), former Major League Baseball player
 Lutellus Lute Boone (1890– 1982), Major League Baseball player
 Luther Lute Jerstad (1936– 1998), American mountaineer and mountain guide
 Lute Olson (born 1934), American basketball coach nicknamed "Lute"
 Lucius Lute Pease (1869– 1963), American editorial cartoonist and journalist
 Douglas Lute (born 1952), retired United States Army lieutenant general
 Jane Holl Lute (born 1956), United States government official, Deputy Secretary of Homeland Security from 2009 through 2013, wife of Douglas Lute
 El Lute, nickname of Eleuterio Sánchez (born 1942), Spanish pardoned criminal and writer

 Lutes (surname), including a list of people with the name

Places
 Lute, Poland, a village
 Lutes Mountain, New Brunswick, Canada

Other uses
 Lute, in chemical engineering, is another term for a U-bend
 Lute (material), a substance used historically in chemistry and alchemy experiments
 Lute of Pythagoras, a geometric figure
 Lute!, a 2012 rework of Blondel (musical) 
 Lutes (brand name), a combined estrogen and progestogen medication
 Lutes, nickname of Pacific Lutheran University in Parkland, Washington, U.S.

See also

 Lutte (disambiguation)